Scott Anthony Bevan (born 19 September 1979) is a former professional footballer currently employed as the under-23s goalkeeping coach at Birmingham City.

Career

Playing career
Bevan started his football career with Southampton as an associated schoolboy player before turning professional in 1997. He never made a first team appearance for Southampton although he did get experience out on loan at Ayr United, Stoke City, Woking (on two separate occasions), Huddersfield Town and Wycombe Wanderers.

In March 2004, Bevan joined Wimbledon (renamed as Milton Keynes Dons at the end of the 2003–04 season) and went on make 19 appearances over two seasons. Out of favour at the start of the 2005–06 season, he trained with Scarborough with a view to a possible loan move in October 2005. However, later that month he joined Conference National side Tamworth on loan. He put in memorable performances in Tamworth's FA Cup run whilst on-loan with The Lambs, which included victories over league sides AFC Bournemouth and Hartlepool United and two ties against Stoke City in the third round. As interest from several League clubs for his signature mounted, his career and life were turned upside down after he sustained a serious kidney injury in a league fixture at Forest Green Rovers in January 2006. After undergoing an operation to remove a kidney that left many thinking he might never play competitive football again, Bevan showed remarkable recovery and resilience to once again make himself available.

Bevan was signed by Kidderminster Harriers in August 2006, despite Tamworth's interest in the talented goalkeeper.
 
In January 2008, and after 18 successful months at Aggborough, Bevan helped Kidderminster reach the 2007 FA Trophy Final against Stevenage, thus playing in the first ever competitive game at the new Wembley Stadium in front of 53262 fans. Bevan was signed by Shrewsbury for an undisclosed fee, in a deal that saw Chris Mackenzie move in the opposite direction.

In September 2008, Bevan joined Torquay United loan as cover for their injured first choice keeper Michael Poke, himself on loan from Southampton. For the second time in his career he helped a non-league side reach the third round of the FA Cup. He signed an 18-month contract with Torquay on 28 December 2008.

On 6 June 2011, Bevan followed manager Paul Buckle to recently relegated League Two side Bristol Rovers. He made his Rovers debut on the opening day of the Football League season, against AFC Wimbledon.

Coaching career
On 4 July 2018, Bevan was announced as Birmingham City's Under-23s goalkeeping coach, the first time the club had appointed a goalkeeping coach solely dedicated to the under-23s. At the start of the 2020–21 season, he acted as first-team goalkeeper coach until Tony Roberts was appointed in October.

In June 2022, Bevan was appointed by Philippines national team to be their goalkeeping coach in the third round of 2023 Asian Cup Qualifiers.

Career statistics

References

External links

1979 births
Living people
Footballers from Southampton
English footballers
Association football goalkeepers
Southampton F.C. players
Ayr United F.C. players
Stoke City F.C. players
Woking F.C. players
Huddersfield Town A.F.C. players
Wycombe Wanderers F.C. players
Wimbledon F.C. players
Milton Keynes Dons F.C. players
Tamworth F.C. players
Kidderminster Harriers F.C. players
Shrewsbury Town F.C. players
Torquay United F.C. players
Bristol Rovers F.C. players
Havant & Waterlooville F.C. players
National League (English football) players
English Football League players
Association football goalkeeping coaches
Portsmouth F.C. non-playing staff
Birmingham City F.C. non-playing staff